The Anatolian Plateau is a plateau that occupies most of Turkey's surface area. The elevation of the plateau ranges from 600 to 1,200 meters (2,000 to 4,000 ft). Mount Erciyes near Kayseri is the peak at 3,917 m (12,851 ft). Ankara, the capital of Turkey, is located in the northwestern part of this plateau.

Overview 

In Turkey, stretching inland from the Aegean coastal plain, the Central Anatolia Region occupies the area between the two zones of the folded mountains, extending east to the point where the two ranges converge. The plateau-like, semi-arid highlands of Anatolia are considered the heartland of the country. The region varies in elevation from 700 to 2000 meters from west to east. The two largest basins on the plateau are the Konya Ovası and the basin occupied by the large salt lake, Tuz Gölü. Both basins are characterized by inland drainage. Wooded areas are confined to the northwest and northeast of the plateau. Rain-fed cultivation is widespread, with wheat being the principal crop. Irrigated agriculture is restricted to the areas surrounding rivers and wherever sufficient underground water is available. Important irrigated crops include barley, corn, cotton, various fruits, grapes, opium poppies, sugar beets, roses, and tobacco. There also is extensive grazing throughout the plateau.

Central Anatolia receives little annual rainfall. For instance, the semi-arid center of the plateau receives an average yearly precipitation of only 300 millimeters. However, actual rainfall from year to year is irregular and occasionally may be less than 200 millimeters, leading to severe reductions in crop yields for both rain-fed and irrigated agriculture. In years of low rainfall, stock losses also can be high. Overgrazing has contributed to soil erosion on the plateau. During the summers, frequent dust storms blow a fine yellow powder across the plateau. Locusts occasionally ravage the eastern area in April and May. In general, the plateau experiences extreme temperatures, with almost no rainfall in summer and cold weather with heavy snow in winter.

Notes

References 
 Bergougnan, H. (1976) Dispositif des ophiolites nord-est anatoliennes, origine des nappes ophiolitiques et sud-pontiques, jeu de la faille nord-anatolienne. Comptes Rendus de l'Académie des Sciences, Série D: Sciences Naturelles, 281: 107–110.
 Bozkurt, E. and Satir, M. (2000) The southern Menderes Massif (western Turkey); geochronology and exhumation history. Geological Journal, 35: 285–296.
 Rice, S.P., Robertson, A.H.F. and Ustaömer, T. (2006) Late Cretaceous-Early Cenozoic tectonic evolution of the Eurasian active margin in the Central and Eastern Pontides, northern Turkey. In: Robertson, (Editor), Tectonic Development of the Eastern Mediterranean Region. Geological Society, London, Special Publications, 260, London, 413–445.
 Robertson, A. and Dixon, J.E.D. (1984) Introduction: aspects of the geological evolution of the Eastern Mediterranean. In: Dixon and Robertson (Editors), The Geological Evolution of the Eastern Mediterranean. Geological Society, London, Special Publications, 17, 1–74.
 Ustaömer, T. and Robertson, A. (1997) Tectonic-sedimentary evolution of the north Tethyan margin in the Central Pontides of northern Turkey. In: A.G. Robinson (Editor), Regional and Petroleum Geology of the Black Sea and Surrounding Region. AAPG Memoir, 68, Tulsa, Oklahoma, 255–290.

External links 
 Anatolian Plateau

Plateaus of Turkey